Frederick V. Ostergren (c. 1886 – July 4, 1945) was an American football, basketball, and baseball coach.

Fred attended high school at the old Roxbury High School in Boston, Massachusetts, where he was a star fullback and outstanding first baseman.  He played both college football and baseball at Holy Cross in Worcester, Massachusetts.  He played professional baseball in the Boston Red Sox farm system for the Manchester Textiles (also known as the Fitchburg Burghers) in 1914 and the Lawrence Barristers in 1915 and 1916.

Collegiately, Ostegren coached at St. Bonaventure, Bowdoin, and Western Reserve.   He also coached at Portland and Deering high schools in Maine and at Malden, Mass.

Ostergren began coaching at Arlington High School in 1931.

Legacy
The Touchdown Club of Arlington annually gives the Ostergren Award for the outstanding athlete-scholar, male and female, of Arlington High School.

Head coaching record

College football

References

Year of birth uncertain
1945 deaths
Bowdoin Polar Bears football coaches
Case Western Spartans football coaches
Case Western Spartans baseball coaches
Fitchburg Burghers players
Holy Cross Crusaders baseball players
Holy Cross Crusaders football players
Lawrence Barristers players
Manchester Textiles players
St. Bonaventure Bonnies baseball coaches
St. Bonaventure Brown Indians football coaches
St. Bonaventure Bonnies men's basketball coaches
High school football coaches in Maine
High school football coaches in Massachusetts
Coaches of American football from Massachusetts
Players of American football from Massachusetts
Baseball coaches from Massachusetts
Baseball players from Massachusetts
Basketball coaches from Massachusetts
1880s births